Statistics of Japan Football League in the 1993 season.

Division 1

Overview
It was contested by 10 teams, and Fujita won the championship.

League Standings

Division 2

Overview
It was contested by 10 teams, and Honda won the championship.

League standings

References

1996
2
Japan
Japan